Milian Park is a neighborhood-named park located on National Park Service property at north of Massachusetts Avenue at I Street, NW in the Mount Vernon Triangle neighborhood of Washington, D.C.  
It is named after an inventor and scholar from Spain, Michael Austin Milian who died nearby in 1886.

References

 

Parks in Washington, D.C.
National Mall and Memorial Parks